Matthew James Holness (born 1975) is an English comedian, writer, director, and actor. He is best known for creating and playing the fictional horror author Garth Marenghi.

Early life and education
Born in Whitstable, Kent, Holness became a fan of Hammer horror films at a young age, to the extent that when, at the age of six, he asked Hammer star and fellow Whitstable resident Peter Cushing for his autograph, Cushing expressed concern that the child knew so much about the films.

Holness attended Chaucer Technology School in Canterbury and went on to read English at Trinity Hall, Cambridge. As a member of the Cambridge Footlights, he appeared in a number of shows at the Edinburgh Festival Fringe in the mid-1990s. He also served as vice-president when David Mitchell was president. Other contemporaries included Robert Webb, Richard Ayoade and John Oliver. Holness received the Master of Arts from Cambridge, graduating in absentia due to his comedy work.

Career

In 2000, Holness first appeared on television as a cast-member of the short-lived BBC Two comedy series Bruiser. In the same year, Garth Marenghi's Fright Knight, a stage show written by Holness and Ayoade and starring the pair along with Alice Lowe, was nominated for the Perrier Award at the Edinburgh Fringe. The show was built around a spoof horror writer named Garth Marenghi. The sequel,  Garth Marenghi's Netherhead, won the Perrier Award the following year.

In 2002, Holness played the role of Simon, an arrogant and sarcastic computer technician in series two of The Office. About the same time, he appeared in the comedy stage play The Mighty Boosh, filling the role of Bob Fossil while regular cast member Rich Fulcher was overseas.

In 2004, the character of Garth Marenghi transferred to television in the Channel 4 horror comedy Garth Marenghi's Darkplace. Despite critical acclaim and a later cult following, the series suffered from relatively low ratings when first broadcast.

From 2004 to 2006, Holness played the character of Keith Bilk in the BBC Radio 4 series The Department.

In 2006, the parody chat show Man to Man with Dean Learner appeared on Channel 4, with Holness playing a series of bizarre celebrity guests interviewed by a sleazy host, played by Ayoade.  One of the guests was folk singer Merriman Weir, in which guise Holness also appeared in comedy clubs around Britain playing a guitar.

In 2006, Holness appeared in the BBC Two comedy series Time Trumpet, a mock retrospective documentary set in the future.

In 2009, he appeared in the Channel 4 sitcom Free Agents.

In 2010, he played the part of a bandleader in Cemetery Junction, a comedy-drama film by Ricky Gervais and Stephen Merchant.

In 2011, he played a minor role in the first episode of the Channel 4 sitcom Friday Night Dinner. The same year, A Gun for George was released, a short film written and directed by Holness in which he plays an angry loner who writes pulp-fiction crime novels about a vigilante called The Reprisalizer, and he played the part of a smug lawyer in Life's Too Short, a sitcom starring Warwick Davis.

In 2012, he wrote and directed a short film for Sky Arts' Playhouse Presents series entitled The Snipist, which depicted a dystopic alternative 1970s Britain stricken by rabies. Douglas Henshall starred, with John Hurt providing the voice of The Ministry.

In 2014, Holness played the part of egotistical movie star Max Gland in an episode of the Channel 4 sitcom Toast of London.

In 2016, he wrote and directed Smutch, a Halloween Comedy Short shown on Sky Arts, in which he played an embittered author haunted by a ghost writer.

In 2017, he appeared in the Channel 4 sitcom Back as a recently deceased father who appears in flashback scenes.

In 2018, he played the part of brooding Swedish detective Knut Ångström in the BBC Radio 4 Nordic noir parody Angstrom.

In 2019, he played Prince Hector of Bulgaria in an episode of the Channel 4 sitcom Year of the Rabbit. The same year, Holness made his debut as a feature director with Possum, a psychological horror film set in Norfolk. He described the film as "not remotely funny". In interviews to promote Possum, Holness said he had written a script for another horror film which he was also hoping to get made.

Holness has written several short stories, such as 'Possum', 'The Toad and I', and 'The Mastiff: A story of The Diggers', which have been published in horror anthologies and as e-book downloads. He has also done voiceover work for audiobooks.

His agents' website lists several projects as being in development with Holness as writer/director: Cometh the Fiend, The Reprisalizer, and The Mast.

In 2022, Holness announced an anthology novel entitled Garth Marenghi's TerrorTome, which is written in-character as Marenghi and presented as one of the character's own works, which Marenghi began working on in the 1980s. It will also be released as an audiobook narrated by Holness in-character, and was released in November 2022. Release was followed by a book tour, where Holness in-character read extracts from the book and conducts a Q&A with the audience.

Filmography

Films

Television

Radio

Bibliography

References

External links 
 
 Matthew Holness - Twitter
 The Reprisalizer - Twitter
 The Reprisalizer - mock fan site

English male comedians
Alumni of Trinity Hall, Cambridge
People from Whitstable
Living people
1975 births